The Lucchese School, also known as the School of Lucca and as the Pisan-Lucchese School, was a school of painting and sculpture that flourished in the 11th and 12th centuries in Pisa and Lucca in Tuscany with affinities to painters in Volterra.  The art is mostly anonymous.  Although not as elegant or delicate as the Florentine School, Lucchese works are remarkable for their monumentality.

See also 
 Bolognese School
 Florentine School
 School of Ferrara
 Sienese School

References
 Garrison, Edward B., Toward a New History of Early Lucchese Painting, The Art Bulletin, Vol. 33, No. 1 (Mar., 1951), 11-31.
 Lasareff, Victor, Two Newly-Discovered Pictures of the Lucca School, The Burlington Magazine for Connoisseurs, Vol. 51, No. 293 (Aug., 1927), 56-67.
 Sturgis, Russell, A dictionary of architecture and building, biographical, historical, and descriptive, Vol. 2,  New York, The Macmillan company, 1901, 565.

Italian art movements
Painters from Tuscany
Romanesque art